Ayer House may refer to:

Alfred Ayer House, Oklawaha, Florida
Thomas R. Ayer House, Oklawaha, Florida
Caleb R. Ayer House, Cornish, Maine
Albert Ayer House, Winchester, Massachusetts
Thomas Ayer House, Winchester, Massachusetts
W. B. Ayer House, Portland, Oregon, listed on the National Register of Historic Places
Ayer–Shea House, Portland, Oregon